Lee Anthony Brennan (born 27 September 1973) is an English singer, songwriter, dancer and actor. He is the lead vocalist of boy band 911.

Biography
Lee Brennan was born on 27 September 1973 in Carlisle, Cumberland, to Una and Francis Brennan. Lee, his two brothers Kevin & Marc & older sister Julie were brought up by Una & Step-Dad Stephen Mcalindon in Harraby & Currock, Carlisle. Lee also has a younger sister Rebecca from his Dad's second marriage. He was diagnosed with Hodgkin's lymphoma twice, first aged nine and then again aged 15, of which treatment left him infertile.

Lee had previously wanted to play for his local football team Carlisle United. However, despite trials and visits from club scouts, he was turned down because, at just 5 ft 4in (163 cm), he was considered too small. However, he captained the county football team at under-14 and under-16 levels.

On 14 September 2006, Brennan married Lindsay Armaou of Irish girl group B*Witched. They split in 2011.

Career

Music
911 were formed in 1995 when Jimmy Constable and Spike Dawbarn met on the ITV late-night dance show The Hit Man and Her and soon decided to form a band. After meeting Brennan, they became a trio and were soon signed to Virgin Records. They then released their debut single "Night to Remember", a cover of the classic Shalamar tune, in 1996. 911 had huge success during their time in the charts, releasing a total of 14 singles and four albums, including a Greatest Hits album. The band announced their split in 2000.

In 2005, 911 reunited and took part in Hit Me, Baby, One More Time. They were successful in gaining a place in the final, where they performed their signature song "Bodyshakin'" and S Club 7's hit "Don't Stop Movin'". Although 911 did not win the competition, the show resulted in a renewed interest in the band. Brennan regularly reunited with the other members of 911 to perform in gigs up and down the UK.

On 18 October 2012, it was announced that 911, along with B*Witched, Five, Atomic Kitten, Honeyz and Liberty X, would be reuniting again for the ITV2 documentary series The Big Reunion.

Acting
After 911's split in 2000, Brennan continued songwriting whilst pursuing an acting career. In 2006, for the fourth consecutive year, he performed as Peter Pan in a Christmas pantomime.

Filmography

References

External links
 Official website
 Official Twitter page
 
 Lee Brennan's agent

1973 births
911 (English group) members
Living people
English male singers
English pop singers
People from Carlisle, Cumbria